Robert Lehmann (born 9 January 1984 in Erfurt) is a German long track speed skater who participates in international competitions.

Personal records

Career highlights

Olympic Winter Games
2006 – Torino, 36th at 1500 m
2006 – Torino, 7th at team pursuit
European Allround Championships
2006 – Hamar, 17th
2008 – Kolomna,  12th
World Junior Allround Championships
2002 – Collalbo, 16th
2003 – Kushiro,  2nd
National Championships
2005 – Inzell,  2nd at allround
2006 – Erfurt,  3rd at small allround
2008 – Inzell,  2nd at 500 m allround
2008 – Inzell,  1st at 1500 m allround
2008 – Inzell,  2nd at 3000 m allround
2008 – Inzell,  3rd at 5000 m allround
European Youth-23 Games
2004 – Gothenburg,  2nd at 5000 m
2004 – Gothenburg,  2nd at 10000 m

External links
 Lehmann at Jakub Majerski's Speedskating Database
 Lehmann at SkateResults.com

1984 births
German male speed skaters
Speed skaters at the 2006 Winter Olympics
Speed skaters at the 2010 Winter Olympics
Speed skaters at the 2014 Winter Olympics
Olympic speed skaters of Germany
Sportspeople from Erfurt
Living people
21st-century German people